Moussa Aouanouk (born 2 August 1972) is a retired Algerian athlete specializing in race walking. He competed at two consecutive Summer Olympics starting in 2000.

Competition record

External links
 

1972 births
Living people
Algerian male racewalkers
Athletes (track and field) at the 2000 Summer Olympics
Athletes (track and field) at the 2004 Summer Olympics
Olympic athletes of Algeria
African Games silver medalists for Algeria
African Games medalists in athletics (track and field)
Athletes (track and field) at the 2001 Mediterranean Games
Athletes (track and field) at the 1999 All-Africa Games
Athletes (track and field) at the 2003 All-Africa Games
Mediterranean Games competitors for Algeria
Islamic Solidarity Games medalists in athletics
Islamic Solidarity Games competitors for Algeria
21st-century Algerian people
20th-century Algerian people